John Burnett (born 24 June 1939) was an English professional footballer who played as a full-back.

References

1939 births
People from Market Rasen
English footballers
Association football fullbacks
Gainsborough Trinity F.C. players
Grimsby Town F.C. players
English Football League players
Living people